Grand-Pré National Historic Site is a park set aside to commemorate the Grand-Pré area of Nova Scotia as a centre of Acadian settlement from 1682 to 1755, and the British deportation of the Acadians that happened during the French and Indian War. The original village of Grand Pré extended four kilometres along the ridge between present-day Wolfville and Hortonville. Grand-Pré is listed as a World Heritage Site and is the main component of two National Historic Sites of Canada.

History of Settlement

Grand-Pré (French for great meadow) is located on the shore of the Minas Basin, an area of tidal marshland, first settled about 1680 by Pierre Melanson dit La Verdure, his wife Marguerite Mius d'Entremont and their five young children who came from nearby Port-Royal, which was the first capital of the French settlement of Acadia (Acadie in French).

Pierre Melanson and the Acadians who joined him in Grand-Pré built dykes there to hold back the tides along the Minas Basin. They created rich pastures for their animals and fertile fields for their crops. Grand-Pré became the bread basket of Acadia, soon outgrew Port-Royal, and by the mid-18th century was the largest of the numerous Acadian communities around the Bay of Fundy and the coastline of Nova Scotia (Latin for "New Scotland").

Colonial Wars
During Queen Anne's War, the Raid on Grand Pré (1704) happened and Major Benjamin Church burned the entire village.  After the war, in 1713, part of Acadia became Nova Scotia, and Port-Royal, now called Annapolis Royal, became its capital. Over the next 40 years the Acadians refused to sign an unconditional oath of allegiance to the British crown.  Some were motivated not to sign for fear of losing their religion, some were afraid of repercussions from their native allies, some did not want to take up arms against the French and others were anti-British (see Military history of the Acadians).

During King George's War the French made numerous attempts to regain Acadia (See Siege of Annapolis Royal (1744) and in 1745).  As a result of British attempts to secure their control over the Bay of Fundy region, they were defeated by some local Acadians, Mi'kmaq and Canadiens in the Battle of Grand Pre.

Father Le Loutre's War began with the establishment of Halifax, which became the new capital for the colony in 1749.  The British established Fort Vieux Logis at Grand Pre, which a Mi'kmaq and Acadian militia attacked in the Siege of Grand Pre.

During the French and Indian War, the British sought to neutralize any military threat Acadians might have posed and to interrupt the vital supply lines Acadians provided to Louisbourg and the Mi'kmaq by deporting Acadians from Acadia.

After the Battle of Fort Beauséjour, the British began the removal of the Acadians. During the Bay of Fundy Campaign (1755), Lieutenant Colonel John Winslow arrived in Grand-Pré with troops on August 19, 1755 and took up headquarters in the church. Winslow also built a palisade, which was recently uncovered through archeological research. The men and boys of the area were ordered into the church on September 5. Winslow informed them that all but their personal goods were to be forfeited to the Crown and that they and their families were to be deported as soon as ships arrived to take them away. (At exactly the same time, the Acadians in the neighbouring village of Pisiguit were informed of the same declaration at Fort Edward.)

Some Acadians escaped the deportation and continued their armed resistance against the British throughout the expulsion campaigns. Before the first year was over, however, more than 6,000 Acadians were deported from the Bay of Fundy region. Many villages were burned to the ground to ensure the Acadians would not be able to return. Thousands more would be deported in the second wave of the Expulsion of the Acadians, which involved the deportation of the Acadians from Cape Breton and Prince Edward Island (1758).  The deportation continued until England and France made peace in 1763.  In all, 12,000 Acadians were deported.  Many Acadians died from drowning, starvation, imprisonment, and exposure.

Evangeline

When the poem, Evangeline, by Henry Wadsworth Longfellow was published in the United States in 1847, the story of the Deportation and le Grand Dérangement, the great uprooting, was told to the English-speaking world. Grand-Pré, forgotten for almost a century, became popular for American tourists who wanted to visit the birthplace of the poem's heroine, Evangeline. But nothing remained of the original village except the dykelands and a row of old willows. There is  a bust of Henry W. Longfellow on site by Sir Thomas Brock.

In 2018, Canadian historian and novelist A. J. B. Johnston published a YA novel entitled The Hat, inspired by what happened at Grand-Pré in 1755. There is no reference to Evangeline in the novel. The focus instead is on two fictional characters, 14-year old Marie and 10-year old Charles.

Preservation of the site

John Frederic Herbin
In 1907, John Frederic Herbin, poet, historian, and jeweller, and whose mother was Acadian, purchased the land believed to be the site of the church of Saint-Charles so that it might be protected. The following year the Nova Scotia legislature passed an act to incorporate the Trustees of the Grand-Pré Historic Grounds. Herbin built a stone cross on the site to mark the cemetery of the church, using stones from the remains of what he believed to be Acadian foundations.

Dominion Atlantic Railway
Herbin sold the property to the Dominion Atlantic Railway in 1917 on the condition that Acadians be involved in its preservation. Acadian history had already become a staple for tourism traffic on the Dominion Atlantic and the Grand Pre site was located beside the railway's mainline. The railway made substantial investments in developing the park and promoting the history and lore of Acadians. Extensive gardens were planted at the site and a small museum was opened. In 1920 the Dominion Atlantic erected a statue of Evangeline conceived by Canadian sculptor Louis-Philippe Hébert and, after his death, finished by his son Henri. The railway deeded a piece of the land and funds were raised to build a memorial church in Grand-Pré. Construction began in the spring of 1922 and the exterior was finished by November. The interior of the church was finished in 1930, the 175th anniversary of the Deportation, and the church opened as a museum.

Parks Canada
As railway tourism declined in the face of subsidized highway construction, the Dominion Atlantic sold the park to the Canadian federal government in 1957. The Canadian Parks Service took over operation of the park. It was designated a National Historic Site in 1982. The Visitor Reception and Interpretation Center features exhibits about the history of Grand-Pré and Acadia.  A video presentation presents the story of the Acadian deportation.

Archaeological activities
Grand-Pré National Historic Site is also the location of an archaeological site sponsored by St. Mary’s University, Parks Canada, and Sociéte Promotion Grand-Pré. While excavations have been undertaken by Parks Canada since 1971, the field school has been operational for ten years, during which archaeologists have identified the cemetery for the Acadian period, the cellar of an Acadian house immediately to the east of the Memorial Church, and has conducted test pits throughout the site looking for evidence of the parish church, St-Charles-des-Mines; Pierre-Alain Bugeauld (Bujold) was the Church Warden [Marguillier aux Mines]; was also a Notary (1706) and a Judge/Justice (1707). Acadian artefacts that have been unearthed include fragments of Saintonge ceramic, nails, wine bottle glass, window pane glass, a 1711 French silver coin, spoons, belt buckles, buttons, clay pipes, etc. There seems to also be evidence of the occupation by New England troops, as well as considerable evidence of the New England Planter occupation period beginning in 1760.

Historic designations
The "Landscape of Grand Pré" was listed as a World Heritage Site by UNESCO on June 30, 2012, having been added to Canada's tentative list of potential World Heritage Sites in 2004. The  of polderised marshland and archaeological sites in the Grand-Pré area were recognized as an "exceptional example of the adaptation of the first European settlers to the conditions of the North American Atlantic coast" and as "a memorial to Acadian way of life and deportation".

In 1982, on the 300th anniversary of the arrival of the first Acadians in the region in 1682, the Grand-Pré memorial park was designated the "Grand-Pré National Historic Site of Canada" in commemoration of the settlement and later deportation of the Acadians.  In 1995, the site and surrounding region were designated the "Grand-Pré Rural Historic District National Historic Site of Canada" in honour of the rural cultural landscape which features one of the oldest land occupation and use patterns of European origin in Canada.

The "Grand Pré Heritage Conservation District" was designated under the provincial Heritage Property Act in 1999, and encompasses the area in and around the hamlet of Grand-Pré as well as the Grand-Pré National Historic Site of Canada.

See also 
 Nova Scotia Heritage Day

References

External links
Grand-Pré National Historic Site of Canada at Parks Canada
Société Promotion Grand-Pré (key reference) 
Acadian Memorial (in Louisiana)
Explore the Landscape of Grand Pré in the UNESCO collection on Google Arts and Culture
Les Ami(e)s de Grand-Pré 
Musée Acadien of the Université de Moncton 

National Historic Sites in Nova Scotia
Tourist attractions in Kings County, Nova Scotia
Museums in Kings County, Nova Scotia
History museums in Nova Scotia
Ethnic museums in Canada
Acadian history
World Heritage Sites in Canada
Parks in Nova Scotia
Buildings and structures in Kings County, Nova Scotia